Kal-e Malekabad (also Romanized as Kāl-e Malekābād and Kāl-i-Malikābād; also known as Kol-e Malekābād-e ‘Olyā, Kol-e Malekābād-e Bālā, and Qal‘eh-ye Malekābād) is a village in Bagh-e Keshmir Rural District, Salehabad County, Razavi Khorasan Province, Iran. At the 2006 census, its population was 208, in 47 families.

References 

Populated places in   Torbat-e Jam County